Samuel Isaac Hopkins (December 12, 1843 – January 15, 1914) was a U.S. Representative from Virginia.

Biography
Born near Owensville, Maryland, Hopkins moved to Anne Arundel County with his parents, who settled near Annapolis. He attended the common schools and graduated from Owensville Academy. Hopkins enlisted in Company A, Second Regiment, Maryland Confederate Infantry, during the Civil War and served until he was severely wounded at the Battle of Gettysburg. After the war, he settled in Lynchburg, Virginia, and engaged in mercantile pursuits.

Hopkins was elected as a candidate of the Labor Party to the Fiftieth Congress (March 4, 1887 – March 3, 1889). He declined to be a candidate for renomination in 1888. Hopkins resumed mercantile pursuits in Lynchburg, Virginia, and died there on January 15, 1914. He was interred in Spring Hill Cemetery in Lynchburg.

Electoral history

1886; Hopkins was elected to the U.S. House of Representatives with 51.55% of the vote, defeating Democrat Samuel Griffin.

Notes

Sources

1843 births
1914 deaths
Members of the United States House of Representatives from Virginia
People from Anne Arundel County, Maryland
People of Maryland in the American Civil War
Politicians from Lynchburg, Virginia
Confederate States Army personnel
Labor Party members of the United States House of Representatives
19th-century American politicians